The Bernard Chunga Tribunal was a tribunal set up to investigate the then Chief Justice Bernard Chunga.

Terms of reference
President Mwai Kibaki established a tribunal which was going to probe allegations that he:
 had planned, condoned and carried out torture;
 had been corrupt;
 had interfered with judges.

Membership
The tribunal consisted of:
 Speaker of the National Assembly Francis ole Kaparo
 Retired judge Justice Majid Cockar 
 Judge of the Court of Appeal Justice Richard O. Kwach 
 Chairman Public Service Commission Eng. Abdulahi Sharawe 
 Senior Counsel Gibson Kamau Kuria.

Resignation
Justice Chunga resigned prior to facing the tribunal.

See also
 Chief Justice of Kenya
 Court of Appeal of Kenya
 High Court of Kenya

References

Politics of Kenya
2003 in Kenya
2003 in law
Legal history of Kenya
Corruption in Kenya